Jung Seok-Hwa (born 17 May 1991) is a South Korean footballer who plays as a winger for FC Anyang.

Career
Jung signed with Busan IPark on 7 December 2012. He was a regular member of the IPark squad during his debut season, often playing as a central midfielder alongside Park Jong-Woo. He scored his first goal for the club on 4 May 2014 against Gyeongnam, heading in from Park Joon-Gang's cross.

Although able to play in several roles in midfield, Jung became a regular on the wing for Busan due to his speed and dribbling ability. In the 2016 season, Jung registered ten assists, the joint highest in the division, and was named in the league's weekly Best XI on seven occasions.

Jung signed with K League 1 side Gangwon FC at the start of 2018 and was a regular for the club in his debut season. Having made a bright start to the 2019 season, he was ruled out for the remainder of the year with injury.

Club career statistics
As of 1 January 2021

References

External links 

1991 births
Living people
Association football midfielders
South Korean footballers
Busan IPark players
Gangwon FC players
K League 1 players